The qualification for the UEFA Women's Euro 1991 was held between September 9, 1989 & December 12, 1990. Quarter finals winners qualified for the final tournament. The tournament also served as qualifiers for the inaugural FIFA Women's World Cup, with the four quarter finals winners and the best quarter finals loser qualifying for China 1991.

Group stage

Group 1

Group 2

Group 3

Group 4

Group 5

Quarter finals

First leg

Second leg

Norway won 4–1 on aggregate.

Italy won 1–1 on away goals.

Denmark won 1–0 on aggregate.

Germany won 6–1 on aggregate.

Norway, Italy, Denmark and Germany qualified for the final tournament.Norway, Italy, Denmark, Germany and Sweden qualified for the 1991 FIFA Women's World Cup.

References

External links
1989–91 UEFA Women's EURO at UEFA.com
Tables & results at RSSSF.com

UEFA Women's Championship qualification
UEFA
UEFA
1991 FIFA Women's World Cup qualification
Qualifying